Khan Bebin (also Romanized as Khān Bebīn and Khān Beben, Khān Behbīn, Khanbeh Bon', also known as Khān Bīn) is a city in Fenderesk District, in Ramian County in Golestan Province, in northern Iran.  At the 2006 census, its population was 10,435, in 2,561 families.

Centrally located within the Fenderesk District of Golestan Province, Khanbehbin is close to the Shir-Abad Waterfall.

References

External links

 Khanbehbin entry in the Dehkhoda Dictionary (Persian)
 Khanbehbin map
 Khanbehbin geographical map

Populated places in Ramian County

Cities in Golestan Province